Officer with a Rose (Oficir s ružom) is a Croatian film directed by Dejan Šorak. It was released in 1987.

Plot
The Second World War has ended and Zagreb has been liberated from Nazis occupation. Petar is a Croatian lieutenant with orders to pursue German collaborators.

Cast
 Ksenija Pajic as Matilda 
 Zarko Lausevic as Petar
 Vida Jerman as ljerka

External links
 

1987 films
Croatian-language films
Croatian romantic drama films
Films set in Zagreb
1987 drama films
Yugoslav romantic drama films